Siddhanath is believed to be incarnation of Lord Shiva. Siddhanath is the patron god of Atpadi and adjacent regions and one of among several regional protective (Kshetrapal) gods of Maharashtra. Historical temple of lord Siddhnath,a big temple built in 450 years ago. The God in this temple is reincarnation of Lord Shiva even called as NathBaba. This God had two wives one stays with him (Goddess Jogeshwari) and other wife that is goddess Zakabai who is staying few km away from kharsundi near from Neilkarnji. God Nathbaba can meet her once in 3 years and this condition was put by his first wife Goddess Jogeswari. So all the villagers go along with Palki of god to meet her some where in December. Near Kharsundi there is a place called Gohdapur where the natural spring of water is coming from ages and does not go dry, the story is that God Nathbabas Horse once saw the snake and jumped and put its feet on ground, the water started flowing there, the snake was there for restrict god from meeting his second wife.

See also 
 Kharsundi
 Bhoodsidhhanath Temple
 Revansiddha Temple, Renavi
 Balumama Temple- Ahilaynagar- Balewadi

Hindu temples in Maharashtra